Doveyseh (also Romanized as Doveyseh, Dow Veyseh, and Dow Vīseh; also known as Doosiyeh, Dūīseh, Duvizeh, and Duwizeh) is a village in Sarab Qamish Rural District, in the Central District of Sanandaj County, Kurdistan Province, Iran. At the 2006 census, its population was 515, in 117 families. The village is populated by Kurds.

References 

Towns and villages in Sanandaj County
Kurdish settlements in Kurdistan Province